The Harvard-Kyoto Convention is a system for transliterating Sanskrit and other languages that use the Devanāgarī script into ASCII.  It is predominantly used informally in e-mail, and for electronic texts.

Harvard-Kyoto system
Prior to the Unicode era, the following Harvard-Kyoto scheme was developed for putting a fairly large amount of Sanskrit textual material into machine readable format without the use of diacritics as used in IAST. Instead of diacritics it uses upper case letters. Since it employs both upper and lower case letters in its scheme, proper nouns' first letter capitalization format cannot be followed. Because it is without diacritics, it enables one to input texts with a minimum motion of the fingers on the keyboard. For the consonants, the differences to learn are: compared to IAST, all letters with an underdot are typed as the same letter capitalized; guttural and palatal nasals (ṅ, ñ) as the corresponding upper case voiced plosives (G, J); IAST ḷ, ḻ, ḻh are quite rare; the only transliteration that needs to be remembered is z for ś. The vowels table, the significant difference is for the sonorants and Anusvāra, visarga are capitalized instead of their diacritics. Finally, it is fairly readable with practice.

Vowels

Sonorants

Anusvāra and visarga

Consonants

Conversion to Devanagari
Sanskrit text encoded in the Harvard-Kyoto convention can be unambiguously converted to Devanāgarī, with two exceptions: Harvard-Kyoto does not distinguish अइ (a followed by i, in separate syllables, i.e. in hiatus) from ऐ (the diphthong ai) or अउ (a followed by u) from औ (the diphthong au). However such a vowel hiatus would occur extremely rarely inside words. Such a hiatus most often occurs in sandhi between two words (e.g. a sandhi of a word ending in 'aH' and one beginning with 'i' or 'u'). Since in such a situation a text transliterated in Harvard-Kyoto would introduce a space between the 'a' and 'i' (or 'a' and 'u') no ambiguity would result.

Harvard-Kyoto method for modern Russian language 
This method allows not only determining the correct pronunciation of Russian words but also maintains the Russian orthography, since a single Harvard-Kyoto letter corresponds to each Russian one. There is no need for diacritical signs and potential digraph confusion is prevented. All symbols are available on standard keyboards.

The Harvard-Kyoto system doesn't preserve upper-case letters, which is not an issue when only considering pronunciation. But the symbol "^", if desired, may give the hint that next letter is capitalized (^b = Б). As well, an apostrophe sign may be used to introduce a "stress" sign if necessary (za'mok – castle; zamo'k – lock).

See also
 Devanagari transliteration
 International Alphabet of Sanskrit Transliteration (IAST)
 ITRANS
 National Library at Kolkata romanization
 SLP1
 Velthuis
WX notation

External links 

 Online Sanskrit Utilities
 
Russian ↔ Harvard-Kyoto system online converter

References

Hindustani orthography
Romanization of Brahmic
Sanskrit transliteration
Hindi